Hymenobacter rutilus is a Gram-negative, aerobic, rod-shaped, non-spore-forming and non-motile bacterium from the genus of Hymenobacter which has been isolated from marine sediments from the Kings Bay in Norway.

References

External links
Type strain of Hymenobacter rutilus at BacDive -  the Bacterial Diversity Metadatabase

rutilus
Bacteria described in 2017